Xylocalyx asper is a species of plant in the family Orobanchaceae. It is endemic to Yemen.

References

asper
Endemic flora of Socotra
Least concern plants
Least concern biota of Asia
Taxonomy articles created by Polbot
Taxa named by Isaac Bayley Balfour